Olen Ulesus Underwood (born May 25, 1942) is a former American college and professional football player.  A linebacker, he played college football at the University of Texas at Austin, and played professionally in the American Football League for the Houston Oilers from 1966 through 1969.  In 1980, he took the bench of the 284th District Court for the State of Texas, and held that elected position until retiring in 2005.  In 1996, he was appointed by then Governor George W. Bush to be the presiding judge of the Second Administrative Judicial Region of Texas.

Underwood's daughter, Nancilea Foster competed in diving at the 2008 Summer Olympics.

See also
Other American Football League players

References

External links

1942 births
Living people
Houston Oilers players
Texas Longhorns football players
University of Houston Law Center alumni
University of Texas at Austin alumni
American Football League players